Sastri is a surname. Notable people with the surname include:
 A. Seshayya Sastri (1828–1903), Indian administrator, Diwan of Travancore 1872–1877 and Diwan of Pudukkottai 1878–1894
 Bapudeva Sastri (1821–1900), Indian scholar in Sanskrit and mathematics
 C. V. Kumaraswami Sastri (1870–1934), Indian lawyer, Sanskrit scholar, judge of the Madras High Court
 C. V. Runganada Sastri (1819–1881), Indian interpreter, civil servant and polyglot
 Cheyyur Chengalvaraya Sastri, a carnatic music composer
 Devudu Narasimha Sastri (1895–1962), Kannada writer, novelist, Sanskrit scholar, ritualist, actor and a journalist
 Devulapalli Krishnasastri (1887–1980), Telugu poet, playwright and translator
 Dhulipala Seetharama Sastri (1921–2007), Telugu film and Stage Actor
 Eemani Sankara Sastri (1922–1987), Veena player of Carnatic music
 H. Krishna Sastri (1870–1928), Indian epigraphist
 Hiranand Sastri (1878–1946), Indian archaeologist and epigraphist
 Ironleg Sastri (died 2006), Telugu comedian actor from India
 Janamaddi Hanumath Sastri (1926–2014), Indian writer and linguist
 K. A. Nilakanta Sastri (1892–1975), Indian historian and Dravidologist
 Lina Sastri (born 1953), Italian actress and singer
 M. Patanjali Sastri (1889–1963), the Second Chief Justice of India
 Madhunapantula Satyanarayana Sastri (1920–1992), eminent personality in pure Telugu literature
 Mannargudi Raju Sastri (1815–1903), Hindu scholar
 Mosa Walsalam Sastri (1847–1916), Indian philosopher, social reformer, poet, musician and theologian
 Natesa Sastri (1859–1906), noted exponent of Harikatha
 Paidala Gurumurti Sastri, 17th century composer of Carnatic music
 Penumarthi Viswanatha Sastri (1929–1998), Telugu writer and editor
 Puranam Purushottama Sastri (1925–2010), Carnatic Musician, winner of Sangeet Natak Akademi Award
 R. V. S. Peri Sastri, former Chief Election Commissioner of India
 S. Srikanta Sastri (1904–1974), Indian historian, Indologist, epigraphist and polyglot
 Sarabha Sastri (1872–1904), Indian venu flute player, known as the first great Brahmin flutist
 Sivanath Sastri (1847–1919), scholar, religious reformer, educator, writer and historian
 Subbaraya Sastri (1803–1862), son and student of Syama Sastri
 Syama Sastri (1762–1827), composer of Carnatic music
 T. Ganapati Sastri (1860–1926), Sanskrit scholar, editor of the Trivandrum Sanskrit Series
 T. R. Venkatarama Sastri (1874–1953), Indian lawyer, politician, Advocate-General for Madras Presidency 1924–1928
 V. S. Srinivasa Sastri (1869–1946), Indian politician, administrator, educator, orator, and Indian independence activist
 Veturi Prabhakara Sastri (1888–1950), Pundit in both Sanskrit and Telugu languages
 Viswanatha Sastri (1893–1958), Carnatic music composer

See also
 Sastri Nagar
 Sivanath Sastri College, undergraduate liberal arts college for women in Kolkata, India
 Seema Sastri, Telugu film starring Allari Naresh and Farjana
 Shastri
 Sastry